In mathematics, the quasi-derivative is one of several generalizations of the derivative of a function between two Banach spaces.  The quasi-derivative is a slightly stronger version of the Gateaux derivative, though weaker than the Fréchet derivative.

Let f : A → F be a continuous function from an open set A in a Banach space E to another Banach space F.  Then the quasi-derivative of f at x0 ∈ A is a linear transformation u : E → F with the following property: for every continuous function g : [0,1] → A with g(0)=x0 such that g′(0) ∈ E exists,

If such a linear map u exists, then f is said to be quasi-differentiable at x0.

Continuity of u need not be assumed, but it follows instead from the definition of the quasi-derivative.  If f is Fréchet differentiable at x0, then by the chain rule, f is also quasi-differentiable and its quasi-derivative is equal to its Fréchet derivative at x0.  The converse is true provided E is finite-dimensional.  Finally, if f is quasi-differentiable, then it is Gateaux differentiable and its Gateaux derivative is equal to its quasi-derivative.

References

 

Banach spaces
Generalizations of the derivative